The Wanshan Archipelago, formerly known as the Ladrones Islands, is a 104-island archipelago that is a part of Xiangzhou District in Zhuhai, Guangdong Province, China.

Administration

Before  was created in 1953, the islands were part of Po-On County.

Geography
The islands are situated in the South China Sea, to the south of the opening of the Pearl River estuary and Hong Kong.

The archipelago includes several groups of islands. The western group, located south of the Pearl River estuary and Lantau Island, was formerly known to Europeans as the Ladrones, from the Spanish for "thieves". It comprises Greater Wanshan, Guishan, and Wai Dangling Islands and the Zhizhou, Sanmen, and Aizhou groups. The eastern group, located south of Hong Kong Island, was known as the Lema Islands. Today, they are known as the Jiapeng Liedao and Dangan Liedao, respectively.

The largest island, Dangan, features mountainous terrain similar to Hong Kong.

List of islands

Islands of the archipelago include:

Dangan Liedao, the eastern group of Wanshan archipelago, and the eastern half of the former Lema Islands chain
Dangan Dao, 13.2 km2 in area and the largest of the islands; 200 permanent residents mainly along Zhangmu Bay and Hengkeng.
Erzhou Dao, 8.15 km2
Zhiwan Dao, 4.5 km2
Xidan Dao, 0.85 km2

Jiapeng Liedao, the southern group of Wanshan archipelago, and the western half of the former Lema Islands chain
 Eyan Shi Dao (O-yen Shih). A 39m high islet about 1 mile north of Beijian Dao.
 Beijian Dao, 3.17 km2. Two peaks rising almost perpendicularly to a height of 300m on the southwestern end of the island, are known as Asses' Ears.
 Miaowan Dao, 1.46 km2 in area. 240m high. It has a small population of fishermen.
 Shan Zhou, 0.16 km2
 Wanzhou Dao
 Huangmao Zhou
 Ping Zhou, 0.144 km2

 Wenwei Zhou (also Gap Rock in English), 0.022 km2. The small island is in the form of two hillocks, about 80 to 100 feet high, and the island derives its English name from the gap between them. The  on the island was built to serve as a navigation aid to vessels sailing to Hong Kong. It was built by a Hong Kong contractor and partly funded by the Imperial Qing Government for both construction and maintenance costs. Besides the lighthouse it had separate European and  living quarters, telegraph and storage rooms. It came into operation in 1892 under Hong Kong control (island still under Chinese sovereignty) staffed by British lighthouse keeper and  assistants. The lighthouse lenses and windows were damaged by typhoons in 1893 and 1905, the keepers eventually abandoned the site, civil war in China left it in ruins by the 1930s and 1940s.

Southwestern group:
 Dawanshan Dao, 8.07 km2. The seat of Wanshan Town of Zhuhai is located on the island
 Xiaowanshan Dao, 4.35 km2.
 Baili Dao, 7.94 km2
 Dong'ao Dao, 4.62 km2 in area with population of 500. Club Med opened a holiday resort on the island in 2014.
 Heng Zhou, 0.54 km2
 Zhu Zhou, 1.66 km2
 Gui Zhou, 0.32 km2
 Dalie Dao, 0.36 km2
 Huangmao Dao, 1.08 km2

Central group, located south of Lantau:
 Wai Lingding Dao, 3.7 km2 in area and a tourist attraction with natural sites (Dangandao Provincial Nature Reserve) and temples. The seat of Dangan Town of Zhuhai is located on the island
  Sanmen Liedao
 Hei Zhou
 Henggang Dao, 0.74 km2
 Sanmen Dao, 0.98 km2
 Sanmen Zhou
 Yuangang Dao, 0.016 km2
 Zhuwantou Dao, 0.33 km2
 Aizhou Liedao
 Ai Zhou, 1.2 km2
 Ai Zhou Zi, 0.6 km2

Northwestern group, located between Lantau and Macau:
 Zhizhou Liedao
 Dazhi Zhou, 1.67 km2
 Xiaozhi Zhou, 1.2 km2
 Guishan Dao - formerly PLA base from the 1950s. The seat of Guishan Town of Zhuhai is located on the island
 Niutou Dao, 1.1 km2. Connected by a road to Guishan Dao
 Zhongxin Zhou, 0.6 km2
 Chitou Dao, 0.17 km2
 Sanjiaoshan Dao, 0.82 km2
 Qing Zhou
 Sanjiao Zhou
 Jishiling Pai
 Dalu Dao
 Datou Zhou

Other geographical elements
Other geographically important points of interest:

 Lema Channel is a major waterway in the archipelago.
 Dahengqin Dao is an island off Macau and not part of this archipelago.
 Erzhou, rising to 437.7m above sea level, is the highest point in the archipelago

Population
There is a small local population, mostly in small fishing villages:

 Dangan
 Danganwei
 Nacun

Economy
The archipelago's economy is mainly fisheries (crystal prawn, peeler crab). There is a growing tourism industry with a focus on history, beaches, and the natural beauty of the islands. About 350,000 tourists visit the islands annually. Club Med opened a holiday resort on Dong'ao in 2014.

There is also potential for petroleum extraction in the waters off the islands.

Tourist sites

Tourist sites of Wanshan Archipelago include:
 Dong'ao: Blundbuss Tower; Son-Soliciting Springs
 Dangan: Dangan Village
 Guishan: Monument to the Martyrs of Guishan Warship; Wen Tianxiang Park
 Miaowan: Xiafeng Bay, a coral beach adjacent to the fishing village.
 Wanshan: A-Ma Temple; Floating Cobbles Bay

Transport

 Ferry service from Zhuhai to Guishan, Wai Lingding, Dan'gan, Dong'ao and Wanshan
 Fast/slow ferry service to Guishan, Wai Lingding, Xiangzhou
 Sightseeing ferryboats from Zhuhai

See also 

Wanshan Archipelago Campaign
Guishan Offshore Windfarm
Pirates of the South China Coast (18th-19th century)

Notes

References

Citations

Bibliography

Further reading

External links

 Aerial image of the islands (Google map)
 Interactive map with the name of most islands
 Map of the archipelago
 Website of the Wanshan Marine Development Experimental Zone 

 
Archipelagoes of the Pacific Ocean
Archipelagoes of China
Populated places in China
Islands of Guangdong
Islands of China